There have been three baronetcies created for members of the Bacon family, all in the Baronetage of England. As of 2008, one creation is extinct and two of the creations are extant. The extant titles have been merged since 1755.

The Bacon baronetcy, of Redgrave in the County of Suffolk, is the premier baronetcy in the Baronetage of England, which was created on 22 May 1611 for Nicholas Bacon, Member of Parliament for Beverley and Suffolk, and the eldest son of Sir Nicholas Bacon, a prominent Elizabethan politician. The philosopher and statesman Francis Bacon was his half-brother. Bacon was the first person to be created a baronet. As the baronetcy is the oldest extant English baronetcy, the holder is considered the Premier Baronet of England. Bacon's second son Butts Bacon was created a baronet, of Mildenhall, in his own right in 1627 (see below). Bacon was succeeded by his eldest son, Edmund, the second Baronet. He represented Eye and Norfolk in the House of Commons. He died childless and was succeeded by his younger brother, Robert, the third Baronet. On his death, the title passed to his grandson, Edmund, the fourth Baronet. He served as High Sheriff of Suffolk from 1665 to 1666. He died without surviving male issue and was succeeded by his first cousin, Robert, the fifth Baronet. He was the son of Butts Bacon, younger son of the fourth Baronet. When he died, the title passed to his son, Edmund, the sixth Baronet. He sat as Member of Parliament for Thetford and Norfolk. He had no sons and on his death in 1755, the line of the second Baronet failed.

The late Baronet was succeeded by his third cousin once removed, Sir Richard Bacon, 8th Baronet, of Mildenhall, great-great-grandson of the aforementioned Sir Butts Bacon, 1st Baronet, of Mildenhall, second son of the first Baronet of Redgrave. He died without surviving issue and was succeeded by his nephew, Edmund, the eighth/ninth Baronet. He was the son of the fourth Baronet of Mildenhall by his second wife Mary Castell. His elder son, Edmund, the ninth/tenth Baronet, died without surviving male issue in 1864. He was succeeded by his nephew, Henry, the tenth/eleventh Baronet. He was the son of Nicholas Bacon, younger son of the eighth/ninth Baronet. Bacon was High Sheriff of Lincolnshire in 1867. His elder son, Hickman, the eleventh/twelfth Baronet, was High Sheriff of Lincolnshire in 1887 and a justice of the peace and Deputy Lieutenant of the county. He never married and was succeeded by his younger brother, Nicholas, the twelfth/thirteenth Baronet. He was High Sheriff of Norfolk in 1895, a justice of the peace and Deputy Lieutenant for the county and Chairman of the Lindsey County Council. He was succeeded by his only son, Edmund, the thirteenth/fourteenth Baronet. He was a soldier, businessman, public servant and Lord-Lieutenant of Norfolk. In 1970 he was made a Knight of the Garter. As of 2014 the titles are held by his only son, the fourteenth/fifteenth Baronet, who succeeded in 1982.

The Bacon baronetcy, of Mildenhall in the County of Suffolk, was created in the Baronetage of England on 29 July 1627 for Butts Bacon, seventh son of the first Baronet of the 1611 creation. His great-grandson (the title having descended from father to son), Edmund, the fourth Baronet, represented Orford in Parliament. He was succeeded by his eldest son, Edmund, the fifth Baronet. He was Member of Parliament for Thetford. His only son, Edmund, the sixth Baronet, died unmarried at an early age in 1750. He was succeeded by his uncle, Henry, the seventh Baronet. He also died unmarried and was succeeded by his younger brother, Richard, the eighth Baronet. In 1755 he succeeded his third cousin once removed as eighth Baronet of Redgrave. For further history of the titles, see above.

The Bacon baronetcy, of Gillingham in the County of Norfolk, was created in the Baronetage of England on 7 February 1662 for Nicholas Bacon. He was the son of Nicholas Bacon, fourth son of the first Baronet of the 1611 creation and brother of the first Baronet of the 1627 creation. His two sons, the second and third Baronets, both succeeded in the title. They both died young and the title became extinct on the latter's death in 1685.

Family seat
Redgrave Manor, the former family seat in Suffolk, was bought by the elder Sir Nicholas Bacon from Henry VIII in 1542 and substantially restored between 1545 and 1554. It was the seat of the Bacon family until debts forced the fifth Baronet, Sir Robert Bacon, to sell the estate in 1702 to Sir John Holt.

Bacon baronets, of Redgrave (1611)

Sir Nicholas Bacon, 1st Baronet (c. 1540–1624)
Sir Edmund Bacon, 2nd Baronet (c. 1570–1649)
Sir Robert Bacon, 3rd Baronet (d. 1655)
Sir Edmund Bacon, 4th Baronet (d. 1685)
Sir Robert Bacon, 5th Baronet (d. 1704)
Sir Edmund Bacon, 6th Baronet (c. 1680–1755)
Sir Richard Bacon, 7th Baronet (Redgrave), 8th Baronet (Mildenhall) (1695–1773)
Sir Edmund Bacon, 8th Baronet (Redgrave), 9th Baronet (Mildenhall) (1749–1820)
Sir Edmund Bacon, 9th Baronet (Redgrave), 10th Baronet (Mildenhall) (1779–1864)
Sir Henry Hickman Bacon, 10th Baronet (Redgrave), 11th Baronet (Mildenhall) (1820–1872)
Sir Hickman Beckett Bacon, 11th Baronet (Redgrave), 12th Baronet (Mildenhall), QC (1855–1945)
Sir Nicholas Henry Bacon, 12th Baronet (Redgrave), 13th Baronet (Mildenhall) (1857–1947)
Sir Edmund Castell Bacon, 13th Baronet (Redgrave), 14th Baronet (Mildenhall) (1903–1982)
Sir Nicholas Hickman Ponsonby Bacon, 14th Baronet (Redgrave), 15th Baronet (Mildenhall) (b. 1953)

The heir apparent is the present holder's eldest son Henry Hickman Bacon (b. 1984).

Bacon baronets, of Mildenhall (1627)

Sir Butts Bacon, 1st Baronet (24 March 1580 – 29 May 1661) 
Sir Henry Bacon, 2nd Baronet (1615–1670)
Sir Henry Bacon, 3rd Baronet (died 1686)
Sir Edmund Bacon, 4th Baronet (1672–1721)
Sir Edmund Bacon, 5th Baronet (1693–1738)
Sir Edmund Bacon, 6th Baronet (1725–1750)
Sir Henry Bacon, 7th Baronet (1693–1753)
Sir Richard Bacon, 8th Baronet (1695–1773) (and succeeded the 6th Baronet of Redgrave in 1755)
for further succession, see above

Bacon baronets, of Gillingham (1662)
Sir Nicholas Bacon, 1st Baronet (1623–1666)
Sir Edmund Bacon, 2nd Baronet (c. 1660–1683)
Sir Richard Bacon, 3rd Baronet (c. 1663–1685)

Notes

Bibliography

External links 
Redgrave Park
Norfolk Heraldry

 

Baronetcies in the Baronetage of England
1611 establishments in England
Extinct baronetcies in the Baronetage of England